The Prairie View A&M Panthers baseball represents Prairie View A&M University, which is located in Prairie View, Texas. The Panthers are an NCAA Division I college baseball program that competes in the Southwestern Athletic Conference.

The Prairie View A&M Panthers play all home games on campus at John W. Tankersley Field. Under the direction of head coach Auntwan Riggins who has served as head coach since 2016.

Since the program's inception, 3 Panthers have gone on to play in Major League Baseball.

Head coaches

Notable players
 Odie Davis
 Steve Henderson
 Charles Hudson
 Hilton Smith

See also
List of NCAA Division I baseball programs

References

External links